Khaled El Kamash (born 1 August 1961) is an Egyptian football manager.

References

1961 births
Living people
Egyptian footballers
Ismaily SC players
Egyptian football managers
Ismaily SC managers
Dhofar Club managers
Ghazl El Mahalla SC managers
Egyptian expatriate football managers
Expatriate football managers in Libya
Egyptian expatriate sportspeople in Libya
Expatriate football managers in Oman
Egyptian expatriate sportspeople in Oman
Expatriate football managers in Saudi Arabia
Egyptian expatriate sportspeople in Saudi Arabia
Egyptian Premier League managers
Association footballers not categorized by position